The Malkana are a Muslim community found in the states of Uttar Pradesh and Bihar of India.

History and origin
In Agra District, the Malkana claimed descent from a number of Hindu castes. Those of Kiraoli, where they occupy five villages, claim descent from a Jat.

In Hathras District, they were found mainly near the town of Sadabad.

In Bihar, the Malkana are mainly concentrated in the erstwhile Shahabad district. In 1923, there were a recorded 1300 Malkanas in Shahabad alone. Because of being plundered by foreign invaders, they were forced to converted and became Muslims, but even though, many of them being connected to the Hindu tradition and culture tried to reconvert through the Swami Sharadhananda's Shuddhi movement which aimed at reconverting them to Hinduism, and but this which led to be targeted by Fundamentalist Abdul Rashid, who shot him death in Delhi Many Muslim leaders attempted to counter this leading to religious tensions in Shahabad, Gaya and Munger. 

At the turn of the 20th century, the Malkana were a community that was on the religious faultline, as there customs were a mixture of Hindu and Muslim traditions. They kept Hindu names, used the salutation Ram Ram, and were endogamous. But the community buried their dead, practised circumcision, and visited mosques on special occasions. This eclectic nature of the community led to attempts by both Hindu and Muslim revivalist to target them. 

This has led to splits in the community, with many members of the community converted to Hinduism in the early part of the  20th century, during the course of the shuddhi movement. The shuddhi campaign among the Malkanas, was launched in early 1923 and led by the Arya Samaj under Pandit Madan Mohan Malaviya. This re-conversion campaign reached its peak by the end of 1927, by which time some 1,63,000 Malkana Muslims are said to have been brought into the Hindu fold.

See also
 Ranghar

References

Social groups of Uttar Pradesh
Muslim communities of India
Rajput clans
Rajput clans of Bihar
Rajput clans of Uttar Pradesh
Muslim communities of Uttar Pradesh